Du Petit may refer to:
 François Pourfour du Petit (1664–1741), a French anatomist, ophthalmologist and surgeon
 Dupetit Thouars (disambiguation)